The Roman Catholic Metropolitan Archdiocese of Colombo is a Latin Metropolitan Archdiocese of the Roman Catholic Church, whose ecclesiastical province covers all Sri Lanka plus the Maldives (which are within the archbishopric). It depends on the missionary Roman Congregation for the Evangelization of Peoples.

The current archbishop of Colombo, appointed by Pope Benedict XVI on 16 June 2009, is Cardinal Malcolm Ranjith. He is assisted in this role by the auxiliary bishops.

The archdiocesan mother church and cathedral seat of its Metropolitan Archbishop is St. Lucia's Cathedral.
Its other National Shrines are the Basilica of Our Lady of Lanka in Tewatta, and St. Anthony's National Shrine a minor basilica in Kochchikade.

Statistics 
As per 2014, it pastorally served 637,729 Catholics (8.8% of 7,281,000 total) on 3,838 km² in 128 parishes with 592 priests (313 diocesan, 279 religious), 1,560 lay religious (380 brothers, 1,180 sisters) and 292 seminarians.

History 

Erected as the Diocese of Ceylon, on territory split off from the Diocese of Cochin by Pope Gregory XVI on December 3, 1834.

Renamed as the Diocese of Colombo on February 17, 1845, having lost territory to establish the then Apostolic Vicariate of Jaffna (now a suffragan diocese).

Lost territory on 1883.04.20 to establish the then Apostolic Vicariate of Kandy (now its suffragan diocese)

Pope Leo XIII elevated it to Metropolitan Archdiocese of Colombo on September 1, 1886.

Lost territories repeatedly : on 1893.08.25 to establish Diocese of Galle and Diocese of Trincomalee, on 1939.01.05 to establish Diocese of Chilaw, all three as its suffragans

Its name was changed by Pope Pius XII to the Archdiocese of Colombo in Ceylon on December 6, 1944, but was returned to simply the Archdiocese of Colombo on May 22, 1972 by Pope Paul VI.

It enjoyed Papal visits form Pope Paul VI (1970.12), Pope John Paul II (January 1995) and Pope Francis (January 2015).

Ecclesiastical province 
Its suffragan sees are :
 Roman Catholic Diocese of Anuradhapura
 Roman Catholic Diocese of Badulla
 Roman Catholic Diocese of Batticaloa
 Roman Catholic Diocese of Chilaw
 Roman Catholic Diocese of Galle
 Roman Catholic Diocese of Jaffna
 Roman Catholic Diocese of Kandy
 Roman Catholic Diocese of Kurunegala
 Roman Catholic Diocese of Mannar
 Roman Catholic Diocese of Ratnapura
 Roman Catholic Diocese of Trincomalee

Bishops

Ordinaries

Bishops of Ceylon
 Vicente do Rosayro, C.O. (1836-1842)
 Caetano Antonio Mulsuce, C.O. (1843-1845); see below

Bishops of Colombo
 Caetano Antonio Mulsuce, C.O. (1845-1857); see above
 Giuseppe Maria Bravi, O.S.B. Silv. (1857-1860)
 Hilarion Silani, O.S.B. Silv. (1863-1879)
 Clemente Pagnani, O.S.B. Silv. (1879-1883), appointed Apostolic Vicar and later Bishop of Kandy
 Christophe-Etienne Bonjean, O.M.I. (1883-1886); see below

Archbishops of Colombo
 Christophe-Etienne Bonjean, O.M.I. (1886-1892); see above
 André-Théophile Mélizan, O.M.I. (1893-1905)
 Antoine Coudert, O.M.I. (1905-1929)
 Pierre-Guillaume Marque, O.M.I. (1929-1937)
 Jean-Marie Masson, O.M.I. (1938-1944); see below

Archbishops of Colombo in Ceylon
 Jean-Marie Masson, O.M.I. (1944-1947); see above
 Thomas Cooray, O.M.I. (1947-1972); Cardinal in 1965; see below

Archbishops of Colombo
 Cardinal Thomas Cooray, O.M.I. (1972-1976); see above
 Nicholas Fernando (1977-2002)
 Oswald Gomis (2002-2009)
 Malcolm Ranjith (2009–present); Cardinal in 2010

Coadjutor Archbishops of Colombo
Antoine Coudert, O.M.I. (1898-1905)
Thomas Benjamin Cooray, O.M.I. (1945-1947), future Cardinal

Auxiliary Bishops of Colombo
 Anthony de Saram (1962-1965) Titular Bishop of Tacapae; appointed Bishop of Galle
 Frank Marcus Fernando (1965-1968) Titular Bishop of Oliva; appointed Coadjutor Bishop of Chilaw
 Edmund Joseph Fernando (1968-1983) Titular Bishop of Igilgili; appointed Bishop of Badulla
 Oswald Gomis (1968-1995) Titular Bishop of Mulia; appointed Bishop of Anuradhapura; later returned here as Archbishop
 Malcolm Ranjith (1991-1995) Titular Bishop of Cabarsussi; appointed Bishop of Ratnapura; later returned here as Archbishop; future Cardinal
 Vincent Marius Joseph Peiris (2001-2018) Titular Bishop of Tacarata
 Fidelis Lionel Emmanuel Fernando (2012-2017) Titular Bishop of Horta; appointed Bishop of Mannar
 Maxwell Silva (2012–Present) Titular Bishop of Lesina
 Jayakody Aratchige Don Anton Jayakody (2018–Present) Titular Bishop of Mulli
 Anton Ranjith Pillainayagam (2020–Present) Titular Bishop of Materiana

List of churches in the Archdiocese 
 Our Lady of Sorrows Church, Kandawala
 Christ the King Church, Pannipitiya
 St. Thomas' Church, Kotte
 Our Lady of Fatima Church, Battaramulla
 All Saints' Church, Borella
 St. Mary's Church, Maharagama
 Sacred Heart Church, Rajagiriya
 Holy Rosary Church, Slave Island, Colombo-02
 St. Philip Neri's Church, Pettah, Colombo-12
 St. Anthony's Church, Kollupitiya, Colombo-03
 St. Mary's Church. Bambalapitiya, Colombo-04
 St. Lawrence's Church, Wellawatte, Colombo-06
 St. Anthony's Shrine, Kochchikade, Colombo
 Fatima Church, Maradana
 St. Joseph's Church, Grandpass, Colombo 14
 St. Mary's Church, Mattakuliya, Colombo 15
 St. James the Great Church, Mutwal, Colombo 15
 St. Sebastian's Church, Panchikawatha, Colombo 10

St. Theresa's Church Colombo 
The Church of St. Theresa is a Roman Catholic church located at Thimbirigasyaya Road Colombo, Sri Lanka. The current parish priest is Rev. Fr. Neil Dias Karunarathne C.Ss.R.

Over time the Catholic community of the area had been growing, and a Fr. James initiated a process in 1934 to construct the existing church. In 1937, a proposal was made to Fr. Giwdan, the parish priest of Bambalapitiya, to lay a foundation for a Catholic church. The bishop gave his permission, and as a result the temporary structure was built and dedicated to St. Theresa.

In 1951, construction started and in 1952 Archbishop Thomas Cooray has handed over the church to Dominican fathers. It was completed and consecrated on 7 October 1961 by Archbishop Thomas Cooray.

See also 
 List of Catholic dioceses in Sri Lanka and the Maldives
 Roman Catholicism in Sri Lanka

References

Sources and external links 
 
 GCatholic.org, Google map and satellite photo; data for most sections
 Catholic-Hierarchy
 Church official website

Senewiratne, A.M. (2020) Till The Mountains Disappear:The Story of St. Joseph’s College, Sri Lanka

Roman Catholic dioceses in Sri Lanka
Colombo
Religious organizations established in 1834
Roman Catholic dioceses and prelatures established in the 19th century
1834 establishments in Ceylon